Gillingr (also Gilling) is a jötunn in Norse mythology, and the father of Suttungr. Gillingr and, later, his wife are murdered by the dwarfs Fjalar and Galar. In revenge, his son Suttungr tortures the dwarfs into giving him the mead of poetry.

Name 
The Old Norse name Gillingr has been translated as 'screamer'. It is a related to the Old Norse verb gjalla ('to scream, yell'; compare with Icelandic gjalla, Norwegian gjella, or Swedish gälla).

Attestations

Prose Edda 
In Skáldskaparmál (The Language of Poetry), the dwarfs Fjalar and Galar kill Gillingr by overturning his boat. When his wife hears of the news, she is "greatly distressed" and "weeps loudly" and the dwarf Galar, "weary of her howling", eventually kills her by dropping a millstone on her head.

Viking Age 
Gillingr is mentioned in a skaldic verse by Eyvindr skáldaspillir (10th c. AD), who portrays the mead of poetry as "Gilling’s recompense".

Legacy 
Gillingr is also a surname, although not very common.

References

Bibliography 

Jötnar